Lake Mohicap (also spelled as Mojicap) is one of the seven lakes of San Pablo City, in the province of Laguna, Philippines. The lake, located in Brgy. The waters of San Pablo Lakes provide a generous source of tilapia for Metro Manila and suburbs.

Legend
The legend of Lake Mohicap is quite similar to those of Lakes Pandin and Yambo to the east. A couple had a very sickly daughter named Munica, and they frequently prayed to God for her health. They promised to do anything in exchange, to which God granted their prayer on condition that Munica must not set foot on soil. She thus grew up to be healthy and very industrious.

One day while her parents were away, Munica was sewing a dress. The ball of thread she was using fell on the ground and when she tried to retrieve it, she fainted and fell. She suddenly sank with the entire neighbourhood, and a lagoon was formed. This body of water was later called Mohicap, derived from the unfortunate girl's name, and mahikap, which means industrious in the local dialect of Tagalog.

References

External links
 Geographic data related to Lake Muhikap at OpenStreetMap
 San Pablo City Official Web Site

Muhikap
Maars of the Philippines
Volcanic crater lakes